Jan Hess (born 2 November 1997) is a Swiss curler.

Teams

Men's

Mixed doubles

References

External links

Jan Hess - Sporthilfe - Portrait
Team Zug Cablex

Video: 

Living people
1997 births
Swiss male curlers
21st-century Swiss people